Sanyasipura is a small village in Mysore district of Karnataka state, India.

Location
Sanyasipura is located 5.5 km north of Krishnarajanagara.

Demographics
Sanyasipura village has 356 people living in 80 houses.  The total area of the village is 68 hectares.

Postal code
There is a post office in the village and the PIN code is 571601.

Education
Government Primary School, Sanyasipura has grades from first to fifth.

References

Krishnarajanagar